Mark Blane is an American actor, writer, and director. He is best known for his work on the film Cubby and his recurring role as "Zack" on the Apple TV+ series Little Voice.

Life and career
Mark Blane was born in Valparaiso, Indiana. His sister is the actress Carly Blane. He attended Valparaiso High School and Syracuse University. He began his film career as a co-writer on The Death and Life of Marsha P. Johnson. He is a playwright and author of The Rock and The Ripe: The Bullied and Bruised Gay Youth of America.

In 2019, Blane wrote and co-directed the feature film Cubby, along with Ben Mankoff, about a babysitter and a young boy trying to discover their place in New York City. The film had its World Premiere at the 34th Lovers Film Festival – Torino LGBTQI Visions and won Buried Treasure at the Chlotrudis Awards. His upcoming short film, Ghost Bike, starring Tamara Tunie, Mike Doyle and Carly Blane, is currently in post production.

Filmography

As Actor
 2019 - Cubby
 2020 - Little Voice
 2020 - Ghost Bike

References

External links
 
 

Living people
American film directors
American male film actors
21st-century American male actors
American male television actors
1988 births
LGBT film directors
Queer actors